Thestor petra, the rock skolly, is a species of butterfly in the family Lycaenidae. It is endemic to South Africa.

The wingspan is 22–28 mm for males and 26–34 mm for females. Adults are on wing from late November to January. There is one generation per year.

Subspecies
Thestor petra petra (Western Cape on the Gydoberg, Tierberg, Matroosberg and Skurweberg mountains around Ceres)
Thestor petra tempe Pennington, 1962 (Western Cape in the Klein Karoo mountains near Seweweekspoort, Elandsberg and Rooiberg)

References

Butterflies described in 1962
Thestor
Endemic butterflies of South Africa
Taxonomy articles created by Polbot
Taxobox binomials not recognized by IUCN